The 88th 2014 Lunar New Year Cup, also known as the Lunar New Year AET Cup 2014 due to sponsorship reason, is the annual football event held in Hong Kong in Lunar New Year. Citizen are authorised by the Hong Kong Football Association to hold the event.

Teams

Squads

Citizen Cuenca United

Krylia Sovetov

FC Tokyo

Olhanense

Fixtures and results

Semi-finals

Third Place Playoff

Final

References

Lunar New Year Cup
Lunar